This is a complete list of 4K Ultra High Definition (UHD) channels in Pakistan which can be viewed over satellite. The first 4K channel to be launched in Pakistan was BOL News.

Currently

Defunct

References 

4K television channels
4K